The Section carrément anti-Le Pen (SCALP; "Absolutely anti-Le Pen group") is a French anti-fascist and anarchist group, formed in Toulouse in 1984 as a manifestation of the autonomist movement.

See also

Anti-fascism
Anarchist communism
Far left
Revolutionary movements

References

External links
  Call for protest on March 5 1985
  Article on 9 May 2007
  Article on the April 15 anti-National Front protest

Anti-fascist organizations
Anarchist organizations in France
Jean-Marie Le Pen